St Mark's Church is an Anglican church situated on North Heath Lane in the newly created Parish and Benefice of Holbrook in the district of Horsham, West Sussex in Great Britain. There is a church hall which is available for hire by community groups or for private functions.

History
The old St Mark's church was founded in 1841, with girls' and boys' schools adjacent to the building. The building was almost entirely rebuilt in 1871, and the chancel was extended in 1888. Following the redevelopment of Horsham town centre the church was mostly demolished, although the church spire was saved and can be seen in the town centre.

The new St Mark's church was established in its current location 26 years ago, as a result of the vision of the diocese and parish to move the church to an area of planned housing development. St Mark's Church is a friendly, vibrant, growing, and active church in the heart of North Horsham. The building is modern in style, equipped with good facilities and it stands at the heart of the community which has formed over the last 30 years in the Holbrook area of North Horsham.

St Mark's Church became a parish church in its own right on 18 October 2016, having become independent of the Parish of Horsham team ministry and will be known as St Mark's Holbrook.

See also
List of places of worship in Horsham (district)

References 
 Victoria County History of Horsham

External links 

 St Mark's Church, Holbrook website

Church of England church buildings in West Sussex
19th-century Church of England church buildings